The seventeenth series of the British medical drama television series Casualty commenced airing in the United Kingdom on BBC One on 14 September 2002 and finished on 21 June 2003.

Cast

Main characters 

Adjoa Andoh as Colette Griffiths (until episode 38)
Ian Bleasdale as Josh Griffiths
Russell Boulter as Ryan Johnson (episodes 3−31)
Louise Brealey as Roxy Bird
Christopher Colquhoun as Simon Kaminski
Kelly Harrison as Nikki Marshall
Kwame Kwei-Armah as Fin Newton
Martina Laird as Comfort Jones
Simon MacCorkindale as Harry Harper
Sarah Manners as Bex Reynolds (from episode 22)
Will Mellor as Jack Vincent (until episode 40)
Dan Rymer as Dillon Cahill (until episode 40)
Zita Sattar as Anna Paul
Cathy Shipton as Lisa "Duffy" Duffin (until episode 31)
Christine Stephen-Daly as Lara Stone
Derek Thompson as Charlie Fairhead
Matthew Wait as Luke Warren (from episode 32)
Lee Warburton as Tony Vincent

Recurring characters 

Liz Carling as Selena Donovan (episodes 25−30)
N'deaya Baa Clements as Jane Winters (episodes 16−34)
Francesca Isherwood as Kizzy Harper (episodes 1−28)
Phillip Martin Brown as Eddie Vincent (episodes 7−34)
Lisa Palfrey as Melanie Collier (episodes 2−9)
Orlando Seale as Merlin Jameson (episodes 17−35)
Paul Sharma as Vinnay Ramdas (episodes 35−40)

Guest characters 

Ian Aspinall as Mubbs Hussein (episode 2)
Radhika Aggarwal as Anu (episode 2)
Nicola Bertram as Penny List (episodes 35−36)
Frankie Carson as Jordan Harper (episode 1)
Nicole Faraday as Heather Lincoln (episodes 2−10)
Sean Gilder as DI Langer (episodes 21−22)
Natalie Glover as Emma Davies (episodes 20−21)
Seeta Indrani as Emma Jackson (episodes 12 and 15)
Beverley Klein as Lyn Paul (episodes 23−34)
Rosalind Knight as Kate Duffin (episodes 2−3)
Judy Loe as Jan Goddard (episodes 9)
Bob Mason as Jeff McGuire (episodes 2, 4 and 25)
Ashley Miller as WPC Paula Newcombe (episodes 2 and 13)
David Paisley as Ben Saunders (episodes 21−26)
Tim Plester as Derek Moberley (episode 35)
Michael Praed as Chris Meredith (episode 34)
Melissa Pryer as Liza Davies (episodes 20−21)
Tarek Ramini as PC Russell (episodes 9−29)
David Robb as Henry Reeve-Jones (episode 18)
Lynda Rooke as Beth Harper (episodes 1 and 13−27)
Maggie Tagney as Stella Bird (episode 6)
Nick Tizzard as PC McCormack (episodes 3−23)
Ashlie Walker as Tally Harper (episodes 1, 14 and 27−33)
Victoria Wicks as QC Mrs. Connolly (episodes 2−4)

Episodes

References

External links
 Casualty series 17 at the Internet Movie Database

17
2002 British television seasons
2003 British television seasons